The World's Longest Cricket Marathon, now officially known as the Longest Marathon Playing Cricket, is a world record of the longest time continuously playing the game of Cricket between two teams.

It is held by Loughborough University Staff Cricket Club from Leicestershire, England. In June 2012, Loughborough University Staff Cricket Club broke the World Record by playing continuous cricket for  150 hours and 14 minutes. The attempt took place from 24 June to 30 June 2012 at the Loughborough College Rubber Crumb. The attempt raised money for a local cancer charity, Harley Staples Cancer Trust. Guinness World records ratified the attempt on 19 February 2014.

It was previously held by Blunham Cricket Club from Bedfordshire in England.   The club played for 105 hours from 10am Thursday 26 August 2010 until stumps were drawn at 7pm on Monday 30 August 2010.  Guinness World records ratified the attempt on 8 April 2011.  The club played in pink and purple to highlight cancer charities for both men and women.

List of record holders 
The following is a list of record holders that have been accepted and ratified by Guinness World Records, or attempts that are awaiting ratification.

Rules 
The record is the amount of cumulative playing time, after breaks are discounted, of a continuous game of cricket.

 Breaks are limited to 5 minutes per 1 hour of playing time
 There are two teams and these teams are limited to 12-a-side (11 on the field plus one "sub")
 No player is permitted to leave the ground unless they are incapacitated
 A break is not permitted between innings.

References

External links
Cheriton Fitzpaine Cricket Club
 Cornwall Cricket Club, Auckland, NZ
 Blunham Cricket Club
Raymond Terrace District Cricket Club
Play-Cricket article for Red Row record

Cricket records and statistics
Sports world records
Longest-duration things